Pratella is an Italian surname. Notable people with the surname include:

Attilio Pratella (1856–1949), Italian painter
Francesco Balilla Pratella (1880–1955), Italian composer, musicologist, and essayist

See also
Pratella

Italian-language surnames